Mandy Moore (born 1984) is an American singer-songwriter-actress.
Mandy Moore (album), her self-titled album.

Mandy Moore may also refer to:
Mandee Moore or Amanda O'Leary (born 1967), lacrosse coach
Mandy Moore (choreographer) (born 1976) U.S. choreographer

Moore, Mandy